Marion Township is a township in Doniphan County, Kansas, USA.  As of the 2000 census, its population was 226.

Geography
According to the USGS, it contains one cemetery, Rosendale.

The streams of Brush Creek and Walnut Creek run through this township.

References
 USGS Geographic Names Information System (GNIS)

External links
 City-Data.com

Townships in Doniphan County, Kansas
Townships in Kansas